Bruce Macintosh Cattanach FRS (5 November 1932–8 April 2020) was a British mouse geneticist, known for his pioneering work in the fields of autosomal imprinting and X chromosome inactivation.

With contemporaries that included Mary Lyon FRS (who discovered X chromosome inactivation), Bruce’s research career was based at MRC Harwell. He would go on to serve as acting director of the new Mammalian Genetics Unit in 1996.

He was elected Fellow of the Royal Society in 1987, and the Bruce Cattanach Prize was launched by the Genetics Society in 2022.

References

1932 births
2020 deaths
British geneticists
Fellows of the Royal Society